Tresillo may refer to:
 Tresillo (rhythm), a rhythmical pattern
 Tresillo (letter), a letter used in Mayan languages.
 , a Spanish card game related to Ombre.